Lazaro Sosa Barrera (May 8, 1924 – April 25, 1991) was a Cuban-born American Hall of Fame thoroughbred racehorse trainer.

Born in Havana, "Laz" Barrera was one of nine brothers who went on to become involved in thoroughbred horse racing in the United States. While in his teens, he began working at a racetrack in his native Cuba and within a few years was one of the country's most respected young trainers.

Seeking increased opportunities in a larger market, in the 1940s Barrera moved to Mexico to race horses at the Hipodromo de las Americas in Mexico City. There, he met California-based trainer Hal King, who encouraged him to come to the United States. Barrera did, and in 1971 trained his first American Stakes race winner. In the ensuing years he built a solid reputation and in late 1975 was given Bold Forbes to train who had been that year's Puerto Rican two-year-old thoroughbred sprint champion. Racing in the U.S. in 1976 under jockey Ángel Cordero Jr., Bold Forbes won several important races for Barrera including the Wood Memorial Stakes in record time. He went on to win the most prestigious race of all, the Kentucky Derby, finished third in the Preakness Stakes and, for a converted sprinter, pulled off a dramatic win in the 1½ mile long Belmont Stakes.

Barrera's accomplishments led to an offer from Louis & Patrice Wolfson to take over as head trainer for their Harbor View Farm in Ocala, Marion County, Florida. There, Barrera took charge of a horse named Affirmed who, under 18-year-old jockey Steve Cauthen, would become one of the great horses in American racing history. Affirmed was a two-time Eclipse Award for Horse of the Year winner and won Eclipse Awards in each of the three years he raced. Laz Barrera won fourteen Grade 1 Stakes races with Affirmed, the most by any stallion in history, and earned racing immortality by capturing the 1978 U.S. Triple Crown, the tenth trainer to sweep the races in a season.  Since then, one trainer (D. Wayne Lukas) has won all three of the Triple Crown races, in 1995 when he trained two horses (Thunder Gulch and Timber Country) for the only individual Triple Crown winner, but it would not be until 20 years after Lukas' unique double that Bob Baffert would do the traditional Crown with American Pharoah doing the triple in 2015.

In a career that lasted almost fifty years, Laz Barrera trained six champions and more than 140 American Stakes race winners. He was the leading money-winning trainer from 1977 to 1980 and in the process became the only trainer to ever win four consecutive Eclipse Awards. In 1979, he was inducted into the National Museum of Racing and Hall of Fame.

Laz Barrera died in 1991; the Lazaro Barrera Memorial Stakes a Grade II seven furlong race for 3-year-olds at Hollywood Park Racetrack is named in his honor.

References

1924 births
1991 deaths
American horse trainers
Eclipse Award winners
Cuban horse trainers
Cuban emigrants to the United States
United States Thoroughbred Racing Hall of Fame inductees